Külaküla (alternative historical spelling Küllaküla) is a village in the island of Hiiumaa, Hiiu maakond (county), northwestern Estonia.

The village name in modern Estonian sounds (can be translated directly into English) as "(the) village (of the) village".

An Estonian Soviet communist and nationalist politician Vaino Väljas was born in Külaküla in 1931.

References

Villages in Hiiu County